Jerovska Vas is a small dispersed settlement east of Sladka Gora in the Municipality of Šmarje pri Jelšah in eastern Slovenia. The area is part of the traditional region of Styria. The municipality is now included in the Savinja Statistical Region.

References

External links
Jerovska Vas at Geopedia

Populated places in the Municipality of Šmarje pri Jelšah